As the Green Star Rises is a science fantasy novel by American writer Lin Carter. Published in 1976, it is the fourth, and penultimate, novel in his Green Star series, continuing from By the Light of the Green Star.

Plot summary
As Karn and Klygon (betrayed by Delgan on a deserted islet) wait for either an inevitable end by drowning (for the Green Star has risen, and a tide with it—threatening to swamp the islet), they hear the swish of oars. Karn then calls out to the ship (just prior to losing consciousness) and the two are then taken on board. The ship, named Xothun (after a large, inland-sea-dwelling reptile) is captained by Blue Barbarians led by the nasty, brutish Hoggur, who sends the two belowdecks as slave-rowers. Their companions include select citizens of Komar, a peaceful mercantile kingdom recently conquered and ravaged by the Barbarians (under the chieftainship of a mysterious "warlord" immune to their racial madness) including its ruler Andar; the ship is on its way to Komar's ally Tharkoon to espy it out for conquest—which Eryon deems as foolish due to Tharkoon being ruled by a wizard. One day, Eryon states that they approach the Angzar Reefs, an area of unpredictable storms—which prompts some of the desperate Komarians to hope for a quick death. However, it gives Klygon some hope, and he asks Karn if he should pick the locks (a skill Karn did not know Klygon possessed). The prospect pleases Eryon and Andar, who figure on using their release and the storm to retake the Xothun. When the storm strikes, the Komarians (released by Klygon's lock-picking) storm up the decks and attack the Blue Barbarians. When Karn runs up to enjoy his first re-taste of freedom, Hoggur crashes into him; Karn jumps on Hoggur and strangles him—strengthened as a residual effect of the "Elixir Of Light", and further by sheer rage—and is then swept overboard. Shortly after the storm the zawkaw carrying a woman (Arjala) lands on the stern—and Arjala alights while the tired zawkaw takes off elsewhere.

The zawkaw carrying Ralidux and the two women lands on an island. The two flee in opposite directions to escape Ralidux—Niamh, into a structure and Arjala into jungled-area. Inside the structure, Niamh disturbs a large serpent or ssalith and flees promptly outside. Ralidux has meanwhile pursued Arjala, who escapes after scratching him to create such opportunity; she jumps on the zawkaw to escape, then hears a voice calling—and wonders whether it is Niamh (whom she doesn't really like) or Ralidux (from whom she is fleeing in terror). Niamh manages to grab the bridle of the zawkaw as Arjala takes off. Ralidux, finding the zawkaw gone, explores further and finds a tubular craft which can fly—and energises it.

In the seawater, Karn hears a voice claiming to be Shann, a young boy from Kamadhong (another treetop city), and swims to Shann's rescue; Shann guides Karn to an island. Due to certain reactions of Shann, Karn deduces that Shann is an adolescent girl; he starts loving her (at least platonically, feeling guilty for deserting Niamh). The two construct a hut and survive for a time. One day, Shann sees an airborne craft coming towards her—as Karn asks for its description, Shann is kidnapped by the craft's occupant.

As described in the ending of the article By the Light of the Green Star, Janchan has stopped the sky-sled. Unfortunately, he stopped it suddenly and struck his head on the windshield—knocking him unconscious alongside Zarqa. When he comes to, he finds Zarqa conscious—and Nimbalim warning them they are in serious danger, as the sled is held in a xoph'''s web. Janchan tries cutting through the strands, but they are too thick, and prepares to face the xoph with his sword (no mean task, due to the xoph being about elephant-sized). Zarqa then reminisces that it would be nice if he had the zoukar, whereupon Janchan remembers another Kalood weapon, a vial of liquid flame. When Zarqa tells him that Karn had taken it, Janchan tells him of another which he had brought on board. he takes it out, and aims it at the xoph, incinerating it and setting its web on fire—which weakens it enough for the re-energised sky-sled to part. Zarqa then follows the mind-trail of Ralidux to the inland sea, and a small island where they continue searching till Zarqa loses the trail.

The liberated Xothun has, meantime, reached Tharkoon where Andar asks its ruler Parimus for aid against the Blue Barbarians. Parimus confesses that he has no great fleet, but does have one large Kaloodha-manufactured advanced airship. The two then plan the invasion, from the Komarians by sea and the Tharkoonians by air. Two delays are then caused when a small aircraft comes in front of Parimus' airship and is shot down. Parimus lands the airship on an island looks to see if any have survived, and is reassured by Janchan and Zarqa that only some of the enamel was scratched—and then dispatches a group of warriors to help them extract the sky-sled. Travelling further over the island (named Narjix) with Janchan, Zarqa (and Klygon who has boarded the Tharkoonian ship), Parimus spots a young boy—whom Klygon recognises as Karn. As the Tharkoonians set down to rescue him, he is attacked by the ssalith--and rescued when Zarqa pursues the monster and makes it attack (and destroy) itself. Parimus then treats Karn's eyes, bandaging them with medicines, in hope of restoring his eyesight.

Meanwhile, the Komarians aboard the Xothun, disguised as Blue Barbarians (but not with disguises that will pass muster under strong light) enter their capitol's harbour. Andar attempts to bluff his way past the harbour sentry and finds out (to dismay) that the Warlord has returned. He quickly kills the sentry, and fights his way to the palace where he meets the Warlord—finding the Warlord's swordplay skills to be as good as his own (unlike the rudimentary skills of the Blue Barbarians as a whole). Andar is almost killed by the Warlord, but narrowly escapes due to his own slipping—during which the Warlord slips behind a panel leading to many catacombs (where Andar does not pursue him, as this would take too long). The Komarians fight their way to the palace roof, where there is an idol of their god Koroga. At that point, several of the Komarians, including Ozad (from the Xothun) are killed by lightning blasts from a weapon (the zoukar) held by the Warlord—who forces Andar (and surviving supporters) to drop their weapons. However, at that moment, Parimus' airship arrives, and uses a combination of the airship's laser/electric cannon and his archers to inflict a reverse on the Barbarians—converted to a crushing defeat as the Komarians now re-grab their weapons.

After the battle, Karn tests whether the treatment worked—and is able to see the Green Star rising through a gap in the planet's cloud-cover. Just then a tubular aircraft comes in over Komar with two occupants fighting in the cockpit. Janchan recognises one as Ralidux (shouting his name) and Karn recognises the other (by voice) as "Shann"—to be corrected as Janchan also sees her and shouts her real name, "Niamh". Niamh finishes the struggle by stabbing Ralidux with a small knife, the "Avenger of Chastity" (carried inside their garments by all Laonese women), and attempts to land the craft. Just then, Karn sees Delgan (the Warlord) jump inside, and a new struggle between Delgan and Niamh—but is too far away to help. However, one of the Tharkoonian archers, Zorak, jumps into the cockpit to see if he can kill the Warlord. As the craft flies out of Komar into the trees, Janchan and Zarqa follow at a distance in the sky-sled. They see a body fall from the craft, but cannot identify which of the three occupants fell.

Arjala tells Karn and Janchan that Niamh had lost her grip on the zawkaw's bridle. Arjala, being inexperienced at controlling the huge bird (and also needing, in any case, to flee from Ralidux) was unable to rescue her from the water.

The 1976 sequel to this novel, In the Green Star's Glow was the conclusion of the Green Star Series

Reception
The novel was reviewed by Don Yee in The Science Fiction Review'', March 1975.

References

1975 American novels
1975 fantasy novels
1975 science fiction novels
American fantasy novels
Novels by Lin Carter
DAW Books books